Dumetia is a genus of passerine birds in the Old World babbler family Timaliidae that are found in India and Sri Lanka.

Taxonomy
The genus Dumetia was introduced in 1852 by the English zoologist Edward Blyth. The genus name is from Latin dumetum, dumeti meaning "thicket". Blyth listed two species in the genus and of these George Robert Gray in 1855 selected the tawny-bellied babbler as the type species.

Species
The genus contains the following species:

References

 
Taxa named by Edward Blyth
Bird genera